Limited-Edition Vinyl Box Set is a vinyl box set by the American heavy metal band Metallica. It was released on November 23, 2004.

The box set includes the band's first four studio albums, an EP and a picture disc single. Each of the sets were numbered 1 through 5000.

Box set items
 Kill 'Em All
 Ride the Lightning
 Creeping Death (picture disc single)
 Master of Puppets
 The $5.98 E.P. - Garage Days Re-Revisited
 ...And Justice for All

Personnel
James Hetfield – lead vocals, rhythm guitar
Kirk Hammett – lead guitar
Cliff Burton – bass, backing vocals 
Lars Ulrich – drums
 Jason Newsted – bass, backing vocals (The $5.98 E.P. - Garage Days Re-Revisited; ...And Justice for All)

References

External links
 Official Metallica website

Metallica compilation albums
2004 compilation albums
Albums produced by Flemming Rasmussen
Albums produced by Jon Zazula